Oldervika may refer to the following locations:

Oldervika, Rødøy, a village in Rødøy municipality, Nordland county, Norway
Oldervika, Tjeldsund in Tjeldsund municipality, Nordland county, Norway

See also
Oldervik (disambiguation)